Mojibar Rahman is a Bangladesh Nationalist Party politician and the former Member of Parliament of Bogra-6.

Career
Rahman was elected to parliament from Bogra-6 as a Bangladesh Nationalist Party candidate in 1991.

References

Bangladesh Nationalist Party politicians
Living people
5th Jatiya Sangsad members
Year of birth missing (living people)